CJE may refer to:
 Canadian Journal of Economics, a peer-reviewed academic journal of economics
 ISO 639:cje, the ISO 639 code for the Chru language
 CJE SeniorLife, a Jewish organization originally founded as the Council for Jewish Elderly
 Cje, a letter of the Cyrillic script